The Presbyterian Church in Rwanda has around 300,000 followers.

History 
The Church was founded in 1907. This year, Germans from the Bethel Mission accompanied by Tanzanians come to Rwanda. After the departure of the German missionaries at the end of the First World War, they were replaced by Swiss and Belgians and later Dutch missionaries.

Autonomy 
Until 1957 the Church activities were concentrated in three main locations: Kirinda, Rubengera and Remera. The Church became independent in 1959 and changed its name to the Presbyterian Church in Rwanda. They abandoned the term "Evangelical" as they did not want to claim to be the one and only evangelical Church of the country. From this moment, the Church focused on expending its presence throughout Rwanda rubengera.

Organisation and Structure 
The Presbyterian Church in Rwanda was strongly centralized during most of its existence. In 2008, with the decline of foreign contributions, it started an decentralisation process in order to give more responsibility to the parishes and encourage them to be more autonomous and self-sufficient. This process is not yet finished as the coaching and support of the parishes is a long and complex task.

Decentralisation 
The EPR (for the French name "Église Presbyteriénne au Rwanda") is now composed of seven autonomous presbyteries located all around the country. There still is an office of The General Synod, which acts as the Headquarters of the Church, in Kigali. It is in charge of most of the administration and organisation of the Church.

The seven Presbyteries listed below have now replaced the 13 old synodal regions. Each includes a certain number of Parishes.
 Kigali (33 Parishes)
 Rubengera (34 Parishes)
 Remera (14 Parishes)
 Kirinda (12 Parishes)
 Gisenyi (20 Parishes)
 Gitarama (16 Parishes)
 Zinga (17 Parishes)

Activities and Programs 
The Presbyterian Church has always been taking care of Education and Healthcare anywhere it was present in the country. It still is today but in collaboration with the State of Rwanda.

It is also involved in environmental protection projects and in the diversification of the knowhow in rural areas. In some regions of Rwanda, agriculture has traditionally always been seen as the only way to make a living. This often led to over use of soils and ignorance of existing professional alternatives.

The official themes the Church is working on and actively supporting are:
 Education
 Community Development
 Healthcare
In these areas the church actively manages 100 schools, 7 locality health centers, and 2 hospitals. The church runs a care center for homeless youth, operating in Kigali, it provides education, housing, and food for over 100 young boys.

Genocide 
In 1996 the genocide affected the church which lost 16 pastors and many of its members. Currently it has around 300 000 members, 100 parishes, 81 pastors and 56 evangelists.

General 
In the post genocide era the church pursues reconciliatory practices between victims and perpetrators of the Genocide. Micro loans are given by the church to promote stable social ties within the community through a common financial ground. Today there are 7 “Unity and Reconciliation Commissions, 1 located within each of the presbyteries. Subgroups of "UFC's" operate within each of the churches congregations. The government "NURC" as well as local "URC's" collaborate on the annual "Week of Commemoration" in order to commemorate those lost in the genocide. 

The denominations affirms the Apostles' Creed and the Westminster Confession.

The main office located at Kigali City.

Member of the World Communion of Reformed Churches.

References

External links 
 http://www.epr.rw

Presbyterian denominations in Africa
Protestantism in Rwanda
Members of the World Communion of Reformed Churches
Christian organizations established in 1959